Vicente Paulo da Silva (born 8 April 1956) more commonly known as Vicentinho is a Brazilian politician as well as a syndicalist and trade union president. Although born in Rio Grande do Norte, he has spent his political career representing São Paulo, having served as federal deputy representative since 2003.

Personal life
Vicentinho is the son of Francisco Germano da Silva and Maria Jeronimo da Silva. Prior to entering politics he was the head of syndicalist organization in São Paulo and was the president for 36 years of a trade union called "Central Única dos Trabalhadores" (CUT) that campaigned for wage equality.

Political career
Vicentinho voted against the impeachment motion of then-president Dilma Rousseff and political reformation. He would later vote in favor of opening a similar corruption investigation against Rousseff's successor Michel Temer, and voted against the 2017 Brazilian labor reforms.

Vicentinho was investigated during Operation Car Wash for allegedly taking R$ 30,000 in bribes from Odebrecht.

References

1956 births
Living people
People from Rio Grande do Norte
Syndicalists
Brazilian trade unionists
Workers' Party (Brazil) politicians
Brazilian politicians of African descent
Members of the Chamber of Deputies (Brazil) from São Paulo
Members of the Legislative Assembly of São Paulo